Blanchard is a census-designated place in Blanchard Township, Traill County, North Dakota, United States. The population was 26 at the 2010 census.

Blanchard is near the North Dakota-Minnesota border, near the junction of state highways 18 and 200.

The KVLY-TV mast, the tallest man-made structure in the Western Hemisphere, stands near Blanchard. The mast is used to transmit television broadcasts from the Fargo station KVLY-TV and was the tallest man-made structure in the world from 1963 to 1974 and again from 1991 to 2008. It is currently the fourth-tallest man-made structure in the world. Similarly, the KRDK-TV mast, the second tallest man-made structure in the United States, stands  from Blanchard, near Galesburg.

Demographics

References

External links
Interactive map showing Blanchard
Blanchard, North Dakota - Google Maps

Census-designated places in Traill County, North Dakota
Census-designated places in North Dakota